William Gibb was a Scottish footballer who played as a half-back and forward.

Career
Gibb played club football for Clydesdale and Queen's Park, and scored on his only appearance for Scotland in 1873.

References

Year of birth missing
Year of death missing
Scottish footballers
Scotland international footballers
Clydesdale F.C. players
Queen's Park F.C. players
Association football defenders
Association football forwards
Place of birth missing
Place of death missing